Sean Bradley (birthday unknown) is an American  conductor, composer, violinist, music theorist, educator, and impresario (producer of large-scale symphonic and operatic events).  Bradley is conductor of the Bradley String Orchestra, and president of Concert Talent—a production company which provides corporate entertainment, engagement marketing, talent management and logistical support for major label recording and touring artists.  In recent years, his activities as an entrepreneur have increasingly included funding and leading a variety of music-related projects on the World Wide Web. He is the founder of Bravoflix, the first online subscription video service in the U.S. dedicated exclusively to the performing arts, as well as a technology consultancy providing custom web application development and cloud computing.  As a musician, he performs regularly on stages in the U.S., China, and Mexico.

Music career

Bradley first gained a reputation as a conductor and active proponent of new music while serving as the artistic director of Opera Nova Santa Monica (Gail Gordon, founding executive director).  His tenure at Opera Nova was closely associated with a group of five Spanish-speaking composers living and working in Los Angeles known as Los Cinco.

In 2004, Bradley started City Opera—a regional opera company based in Los Angeles. His first leadership initiative was the establishment of an extensive education and outreach program. Under his guidance, City Opera won a significant contract authorizing the company to deliver music education services to schools throughout the entire Los Angeles Unified School District, immediately placing the professional scope of the company's community engagement alongside other leading Los Angeles cultural institutions including Los Angeles Music Center, Los Angeles Philharmonic, and Los Angeles Opera.  Bradley's unique vision for City Opera as a cooperative social enterprise enabled the company to earn year over year increases in unrestricted revenue and to operate uninterrupted without philanthropy.  City Opera continues to provide education and outreach related programs.

In 2012, City Opera's production related activities were merged with Concert Talent—with the primary mission of serving major label touring artists, major corporate clients, and the unique needs of privately contracted talent in the global freelance music industry.

Concurrently in 2012, Bradley founded the Bradley String Orchestra—for which he serves as the conductor. The orchestra has gone on to perform in sold out stadiums across the southwestern United States, primarily in support of multi-Grammy winning Latin music legend, Marco Antonio Solis. The orchestra—composed of top Los Angeles talent—is noted for its superior musicality, spectacular stage presence, and engaging choreography. It is also one of the most culturally diverse ensembles in the U.S.

In recent years—2017 to the present—Bradley has been working with Bridge (musician) and IDK (rapper).

Technology career

In the mid-nineties, while attending the Eastman School of Music, Bradley experimented with various technologies in the commercial analysis and automated creation of music for mass consumption via artificial intelligence.  His later social experiments and statistical modelling of purchase habits among popular music consumers anticipated algorithmically driven preference engines used today by companies like Pandora and Amazon.

In 2010, Bradley founded Bravoflix, an online video subscription service providing live streaming and on-demand performances of music, dance, and theater—the first site of its kind in the United States dedicated exclusively to the performing arts.

In 2013, Bradley founded BlogBlimp, a tech consultancy specializing in open source, cloud-driven web applications. The company's clients have included Fullscreen (company), one of the largest YouTube networks in the world, and the Los Angeles Philharmonic, the orchestra with the largest operating budget in the world.

In 2016, Bradley founded Wolfskill, a consultancy specializing in due diligence as a service for technology company investors and founders—including executive background checks and code reviews.

Performances

In addition to his duties as a conductor and company director, Bradley's work as a principal and section violin player includes a busy schedule of activity among orchestras around the world. In 2007, 2011, and 2012, he toured the entire eastern coast of China with the Mantovani Orchestra.  His choreographed ensemble—the Sean Bradley Strings—regularly accompanies musical superstar and Latin Grammy winner Marco Antonio Solís in sold-out stadium shows in the U.S. and in Mexico. As a soloist, he has premiered original music for the stage by Stephen Schwartz—the composer of the hit musical Wicked—with TheaterWorks in the San Francisco Bay area, and was the featured violinist in a West Coast premiere for Musical Theater West in Long Beach. He has served as concertmaster for several regional orchestras including the Antelope Valley Symphony Orchestra, Torrance Symphony, Opera a la Carte, Opera Nova, the Culver City Chamber Orchestra, the Disney-Grammy Collegiate Orchestra, the Eastman Opera and Studio Orchestras, and well as assistant concertmaster for the Orquesta de Baja California. He has served as principal second violin for the Golden State Pops Orchestra, Ventura Music Festival, Asian-American Philharmonic, Saint Matthews Chamber Orchestra, and El Paso Opera, and performed as a substitute first violin for West Bay Opera. He performs regularly with the symphonies and philharmonic orchestras of West L.A., Southeast L.A., Marina Del Rey, Brentwood, Burbank, Calabasas, Antelope Valley, San Bernardino, Redlands, and Riverside, and has performed with the Mozart Chamber Orchestra, Angeles Baroque Orchestra, the Henry Mancini Institute Orchestra, the dAKAH Hip Hop Orchestra, and others. In 2005, Bradley toured with the Orquesta de Baja California and world famous guitarist Angel Romero to New York City's Lincoln Center, and has visited nearly all of the contiguous United States in multiple tours with other leading orchestras. Bradley has played under the batons of such musical luminaries as Elmer Bernstein, Christoph von Dohnányi, Jerry Goldsmith, Quincy Jones, Michael Kamen, Lalo Schifrin, Gunther Schuller, Yuri Temirkanov, Michael Tilson Thomas, and John Williams, and has performed in concerts featuring Stevie Wonder, Tony Bennett, Diana Krall, Josh Groban, Marc Antony, Rita Coolidge, Arturo Sandoval, Christian McBride, Alex Acuña, Pinchas Zukerman, and other leading classical, pop, and jazz musicians. Bradley has performed in every major venue in Los Angeles from Disney Hall to the Cathedral of Our Lady of the Angels to The Playboy Mansion, and has made brief appearances playing the violin in the films Ray (with Jamie Foxx), Hannibal (with Anthony Hopkins), and Monster-in-Law (with Jennifer Lopez and Jane Fonda).

Arts Education Advocacy

Bradley is a dedicated advocate for arts education, and works regularly and directly with students attending a wide variety of pre-professional, public, private, and charter schools, including inner-city schools. He served as a middle school band and orchestra teacher and as a continuation high school teacher for "at risk" students within the Glendale Unified School District.  He is a former artist-faculty member of the Orange County High School of the Arts where he taught advanced placement (collegiate) music theory, a strings masterclass, and computer music notation.  His work as Music Education Manager for The Da Camera Society at Mount St. Mary's College included coaching advanced chamber music ensembles at the Colburn School in the preparation and delivery of effective outreach presentations.  More recently, in tandem with his work for Marco Antonio Solis, he leads a nationwide mentoring and outreach initiative for touring musicians, preparing them to excite stadium size audiences, while connecting them with schools local to each city on tour.  He is on the steering committee for the Los Angeles Arts Consortium, and a board member of the Daniel Catán Foundation.

Conservatory and Military Training

Bradley is a graduate of the Eastman School of Music where—in addition to music theory and computer programming—he studied violin with Ilya Kaler, and composition with Christopher Rouse and Allan Schindler.  He studied conducting with John Farrer and briefly with Jorge Mester.  Other teachers included Aurelio de la Vega and Abram Shtern. He spent several years living in the studio of famed Dutch painter, Jan H. Hoowij, mentored there by the artist's widow, Pem Hoowij—a protégé of Émile Jaques-Dalcroze.

Bradley is a former Special Operations paratrooper with the US Army Rangers and member of the 3rd US Infantry Regiment (The Old Guard)—Presidential Escort unit.  He served in Kuwait and Iraq in 1994 during Operation Vigilant Warrior.

See also

Los Cinco

References

External links

Concert Talent on Instagram
Concert Talent
Wolfskill
BlogBlimp
Operation Vigilant Warrior

Year of birth missing (living people)
Living people
Musicians from Los Angeles
American male conductors (music)
American male composers
21st-century American composers
American male violinists
Classical musicians from California
21st-century American conductors (music)
21st-century American violinists
21st-century American male musicians
Mass media pioneers
Technology company founders
Technology business executives
American technology executives
American innovators